The Murmansk constituency (No.128) is a Russian legislative constituency covering the entirety of Murmansk Oblast. In 1993-2003 the constituency covered Murmansk, Severomorsk and their surroundings, while the rest of Murmansk Oblast were placed into Monchegorsk constituency. In 2003 Murmansk Oblast lost its second constituency which made Murmansk constituency the only one in the region.

Members elected

Election results

1993

|-
! colspan=2 style="background-color:#E9E9E9;text-align:left;vertical-align:top;" |Candidate
! style="background-color:#E9E9E9;text-align:left;vertical-align:top;" |Party
! style="background-color:#E9E9E9;text-align:right;" |Votes
! style="background-color:#E9E9E9;text-align:right;" |%
|-
|style="background-color:#0085BE"|
|align=left|Andrey Kozyrev
|align=left|Choice of Russia
|
|38.51%
|-
|style="background-color:"|
|align=left|Yury Lysenko
|align=left|Independent
| -
|12.10%
|-
| colspan="5" style="background-color:#E9E9E9;"|
|- style="font-weight:bold"
| colspan="3" style="text-align:left;" | Total
| 
| 100%
|-
| colspan="5" style="background-color:#E9E9E9;"|
|- style="font-weight:bold"
| colspan="4" |Source:
|
|}

1995

|-
! colspan=2 style="background-color:#E9E9E9;text-align:left;vertical-align:top;" |Candidate
! style="background-color:#E9E9E9;text-align:left;vertical-align:top;" |Party
! style="background-color:#E9E9E9;text-align:right;" |Votes
! style="background-color:#E9E9E9;text-align:right;" |%
|-
|style="background-color:"|
|align=left|Andrey Kozyrev (incumbent)
|align=left|Independent
|
|40.04%
|-
|style="background-color:"|
|align=left|Lyubov Zhirinovskaya
|align=left|Liberal Democratic Party
|
|9.28%
|-
|style="background-color:"|
|align=left|Igor Lebedev
|align=left|Yabloko
|
|7.90%
|-
|style="background-color:#2C299A"|
|align=left|Igor Chernyshenko
|align=left|Congress of Russian Communities
|
|7.37%
|-
|style="background-color:"|
|align=left|Yury Tarakanov
|align=left|Independent
|
|6.65%
|-
|style="background-color:"|
|align=left|Yevgeny Borodich
|align=left|Independent
|
|4.05%
|-
|style="background-color:"|
|align=left|Vyacheslav Zilanov
|align=left|Independent
|
|3.02%
|-
|style="background-color:"|
|align=left|Svetlana Vodolazhko
|align=left|Independent
|
|2.18%
|-
|style="background-color:"|
|align=left|Olga Kiseleva
|align=left|Independent
|
|2.16%
|-
|style="background-color:#FE4801"|
|align=left|Aleksandr Lysakov
|align=left|Pamfilova–Gurov–Lysenko
|
|1.72%
|-
|style="background-color:"|
|align=left|Valery Kuzmin
|align=left|Agrarian Party
|
|1.40%
|-
|style="background-color:#DD137B"|
|align=left|Vladislav Loskutov
|align=left|Social Democrats
|
|1.26%
|-
|style="background-color:"|
|align=left|Oleg Chernobylsky
|align=left|Independent
|
|1.14%
|-
|style="background-color:#000000"|
|colspan=2 |against all
|
|9.80%
|-
| colspan="5" style="background-color:#E9E9E9;"|
|- style="font-weight:bold"
| colspan="3" style="text-align:left;" | Total
| 
| 100%
|-
| colspan="5" style="background-color:#E9E9E9;"|
|- style="font-weight:bold"
| colspan="4" |Source:
|
|}

1999

|-
! colspan=2 style="background-color:#E9E9E9;text-align:left;vertical-align:top;" |Candidate
! style="background-color:#E9E9E9;text-align:left;vertical-align:top;" |Party
! style="background-color:#E9E9E9;text-align:right;" |Votes
! style="background-color:#E9E9E9;text-align:right;" |%
|-
|style="background-color:"|
|align=left|Vladimir Gusenkov
|align=left|Independent
|
|32.55%
|-
|style="background-color:"|
|align=left|Vasily Kalaida
|align=left|Independent
|
|16.65%
|-
|style="background-color:"|
|align=left|Irina Paykacheva
|align=left|Yabloko
|
|13.39%
|-
|style="background-color:"|
|align=left|Lyubov Zhirinovskaya
|align=left|Liberal Democratic Party
|
|11.49%
|-
|style="background-color:#084284"|
|align=left|Tamara Kononenko
|align=left|Spiritual Heritage
|
|7.21%
|-
|style="background-color:#FF4400"|
|align=left|Yan Mezentsev
|align=left|Andrey Nikolayev and Svyatoslav Fyodorov Bloc
|
|2.55%
|-
|style="background-color:#000000"|
|colspan=2 |against all
|
|14.87%
|-
| colspan="5" style="background-color:#E9E9E9;"|
|- style="font-weight:bold"
| colspan="3" style="text-align:left;" | Total
| 
| 100%
|-
| colspan="5" style="background-color:#E9E9E9;"|
|- style="font-weight:bold"
| colspan="4" |Source:
|
|}

2003

|-
! colspan=2 style="background-color:#E9E9E9;text-align:left;vertical-align:top;" |Candidate
! style="background-color:#E9E9E9;text-align:left;vertical-align:top;" |Party
! style="background-color:#E9E9E9;text-align:right;" |Votes
! style="background-color:#E9E9E9;text-align:right;" |%
|-
|style="background-color:"|
|align=left|Igor Chernyshenko (incumbent)
|align=left|United Russia
|
|46.04%
|-
|style="background-color:"|
|align=left|Vasily Kalaida
|align=left|Communist Party
|
|14.68%
|-
|style="background-color:#C21022"|
|align=left|Rimma Kuruch
|align=left|Russian Pensioners' Party-Party of Social Justice
|
|8.15%
|-
|style="background-color:"|
|align=left|Igor Lebedev
|align=left|Yabloko
|
|6.46%
|-
|style="background-color:"|
|align=left|Aleksandr Kudasov
|align=left|Liberal Democratic Party
|
|6.03%
|-
|style="background-color:"|
|align=left|Aleksandr Voytenko
|align=left|Independent
|
|1.92%
|-
|style="background-color:#164C8C"|
|align=left|Vitaly Golovkov
|align=left|United Russian Party Rus'
|
|1.16%
|-
|style="background-color:#000000"|
|colspan=2 |against all
|
|14.39%
|-
| colspan="5" style="background-color:#E9E9E9;"|
|- style="font-weight:bold"
| colspan="3" style="text-align:left;" | Total
| 
| 100%
|-
| colspan="5" style="background-color:#E9E9E9;"|
|- style="font-weight:bold"
| colspan="4" |Source:
|
|}

2016

|-
! colspan=2 style="background-color:#E9E9E9;text-align:left;vertical-align:top;" |Candidate
! style="background-color:#E9E9E9;text-align:leftt;vertical-align:top;" |Party
! style="background-color:#E9E9E9;text-align:right;" |Votes
! style="background-color:#E9E9E9;text-align:right;" |%
|-
| style="background-color: " |
|align=left|Alexey Veller
|align=left|United Russia
|
|44.16%
|-
|style="background-color:"|
|align=left|Maksim Belov
|align=left|Liberal Democratic Party
|
|15.48%
|-
|style="background-color:"|
|align=left|Gennady Stepakhno
|align=left|Communist Party
|
|12.72%
|-
|style="background:"| 
|align=left|Aleksandr Makarevich
|align=left|A Just Russia
|
|10.75%
|-
|style="background-color: "|
|align=left|Igor Morar
|align=left|Civic Platform
|
|4.39%
|-
|style="background:"| 
|align=left|Oleg Drozdov
|align=left|Yabloko
|
|3.02%
|-
|style="background-color: "|
|align=left|Sergey Pakhomov
|align=left|Rodina
|
|2.76%
|-
|style="background-color: "|
|align=left|Andrey Kapitonov
|align=left|People's Freedom Party
|
|1.78%
|-
| colspan="5" style="background-color:#E9E9E9;"|
|- style="font-weight:bold"
| colspan="3" style="text-align:left;" | Total
| 
| 100%
|-
| colspan="5" style="background-color:#E9E9E9;"|
|- style="font-weight:bold"
| colspan="4" |Source:
|
|}

2021

|-
! colspan=2 style="background-color:#E9E9E9;text-align:left;vertical-align:top;" |Candidate
! style="background-color:#E9E9E9;text-align:left;vertical-align:top;" |Party
! style="background-color:#E9E9E9;text-align:right;" |Votes
! style="background-color:#E9E9E9;text-align:right;" |%
|-
|style="background-color:"|
|align=left|Tatyana Kusayko
|align=left|United Russia
|
|34.38%
|-
|style="background-color: " |
|align=left|Aleksandr Makarevich
|align=left|A Just Russia — For Truth
|
|18.68%
|-
|style="background-color:"|
|align=left|Valery Yarantsev
|align=left|Communist Party
|
|16.28%
|-
|style="background-color:"|
|align=left|Stanislav Gontar
|align=left|Liberal Democratic Party
|
|9.20%
|-
|style="background-color: "|
|align=left|Artyom Maryshev
|align=left|New People
|
|8.38%
|-
|style="background-color: "|
|align=left|Sergey Yevsyukov
|align=left|Party of Pensioners
|
|6.64%
|-
|style="background:"| 
|align=left|Nikolay Palchenko
|align=left|Party of Growth
|
|1.35%
|-
| colspan="5" style="background-color:#E9E9E9;"|
|- style="font-weight:bold"
| colspan="3" style="text-align:left;" | Total
| 
| 100%
|-
| colspan="5" style="background-color:#E9E9E9;"|
|- style="font-weight:bold"
| colspan="4" |Source:
|
|}

Notes

References

Russian legislative constituencies
Politics of Murmansk Oblast